Sandwich station is a railway station in Sandwich, Massachusetts on Cape Cod. It is currently only used by the Cape Cod Central Railroad as a whistle stop for its seasonal excursion trains.

History

The original passenger station in Sandwich was opened in May 1848 when the Cape Cod Branch Railroad extended its rail line from Middleborough to Sandwich.

The original station was replaced by a brick station building in 1878. It was demolished in the 1980s.

Scheduled year-round passenger service was operated to Sandwich from 1848 until June 30, 1959, when the New Haven Railroad discontinued all passenger service on its Old Colony division. During the summers of 1961 to 1964 the New Haven Railroad operated weekend service between New York and Hyannis, with a scheduled stop in Sandwich. New Haven trains of the 1930s-1960s included the Day Cape Codder, Neptune and Night Cape Codder,  in addition to several trains a day year round to Boston.

The station also saw a restoration of seasonal service between 1984 and 1988 when the Cape Cod & Hyannis Railroad operated service between Braintree, Massachusetts and Cape Cod. The Sandwich station was also used from 1986 to 1996 for Amtrak's Cape Codder service. However, it has been eliminated from the schedule of the seasonal Cape Flyer train service initiated in 2013.

Sandwich station currently serves as a whistle stop for select tourist excursion trains operated by Cape Cod Central Railroad, and also serves as the "turning point" for trains traveling to Mill Creek in Sandwich.

References

External links

Sandwich, Massachusetts
Cape Cod Central Railroad stations
Old Colony Railroad Stations on Cape Cod
Stations along Old Colony Railroad lines
Former Amtrak stations in Massachusetts